Dudley is a town in the West Midlands of England.

Dudley or Dudly may also refer to:

Places

Australia
 Dudley, New South Wales, a suburb of Newcastle
 Dudley County, New South Wales
Hundred of Dudley, a cadastral division on Kangaroo Island, South Australia
District Council of Dudley, a former local government area
 Dudley Conservation Park, a protected area
 Dudley Peninsula, a peninsula

Canada
 Dudley, Ontario, a community in the township of Muskoka Lakes, Ontario

United Kingdom
 Metropolitan Borough of Dudley, West Midlands
 A number of parliamentary constituencies, centred on the town of Dudley
 County Borough of Dudley, a former government district
 Dudley, Tyne and Wear

United States
 Dudley, Georgia, a city
 Dudley, Iowa, a ghost town
 Dudley, Polk County, Iowa, a ghost town
 Dudley, Massachusetts, a town
 Dudley, Minnesota, unincorporated community
 Dudley, Missouri, a city
 Dudley, North Carolina, an unincorporated town
 Dudley, Ohio, an unincorporated community
 Dudley, Pennsylvania, a borough
 Dudley, South Dakota, a census-designated place
 Dudley, Wisconsin, an unincorporated community
 Dudleytown, Connecticut, a ghost town
 Dudley Township, Henry County, Indiana
 Dudley Township, Haskell County, Kansas
 Dudley Township, Hardin County, Ohio
 Dudley Township, Clearwater County, Minnesota
 Dudley Observatory, an astronomical observatory in Schenectady, New York
 Nubian Square (formerly Dudley Square), Roxbury, Boston, Massachusetts
 Nubian station (formerly Dudley station), a bus terminal in Nubian Square
 Camp Dudley, YMCA, a boys camp in upstate New York

People
 Dudley (given name)
 Dudley (surname)

Titles
 Earl of Dudley
 Baron Dudley

Other uses
 Calymene blumenbachii, a trilobite nicknamed the Dudley Bug or Dudley Locust
 Dudley (dog), a type of Labrador Retriever
 Dudly Bug or Dudly, a cyclecar manufactured between 1913 and 1915
 Dudley (TV series), a CBS sitcom starring Dudley Moore and Joanna Cassidy
 Dudley College, Dudley, West Midlands, England
 Dudley (Street Fighter), a character in Capcom's Street Fighter video game series

See also
 Dudley Park (disambiguation)
 The Dudley Brothers, professional wrestling tag team / stable
 The Dudley Boyz, a tag team made up of two of the Dudley Brothers